George Scovil may refer to:

 George G. Scovil (1842–?), merchant and political figure in New Brunswick, Canada
 George Fred Scovil, Canadian Anglican priest